Judith Somogi (May 13, 1937– March 23, 1988) was an American conductor, the first woman conductor in the New York City Opera.

Biography
Born to Louis and Antonina Somogi in 1937 in Brooklyn, Somogi studied piano, violin, and organ at the Juilliard School of Music graduating in 1961. She also took courses in Tanglewood, Massachusetts at Berkshire Music Center. Initially Somogi worked as a piano teacher before joining the New York City Opera. From 1966 she was rehearsal pianist, chorus master and coach before she got the chance to take on conducting there. Between seasons Somogi worked as an assistant conductor to Thomas Schippers in Italy at the Spoleto Festival and to and Leopold Stokowski in New York at the American Symphony. Somogi conducted in San Francisco, San Diego, Los Angeles, Pittsburgh, San Antonio and Saarbrücken. Somogi also conducted with the Oklahoma City Orchestra and the Tulsa Philharmonic. A documentary, On Stage with Judith Somogi, was made about her for PBS.

In 1974 Somogi became the first woman conductor in the New York City Opera. She was first conductor at the Oper Frankfurt from 1982 to 1987. In 1984 she became the first woman to conduct in one of Italy's major opera houses. Poor health caused her to retire in 1987 and she died in Long Island, in 1988 after a four year battle with cancer.

References

1937 births
1988 deaths
Musicians from Brooklyn
American conductors (music)
Juilliard School alumni